

Park Jong-soo (1941 – 27 November 2021) was a South Korean master of taekwondo and one of the twelve original masters of taekwondo of the Korea Taekwon-Do Association. He held the rank of 9th dan. Following a career in the South Korean military, he emigrated to Canada in 1968.

Early life
Park was born in Chung-Nam, Korea, in 1941, during the period of Japanese occupation. He trained in taekwondo under Choi Hong-hi. In 1965, he was invited to be the coach of the German Taekwon-Do Association, and moved from South Korea to West Germany. Park was ranked 5th dan that year. The following year, he moved to the Netherlands and founded the Netherlands Taekwon-Do Association. Through the late 1960s and 1970s, Park was a key member of the taekwondo demonstration teams that accompanied Choi around the world.

Canada
In 1968, Park settled in Toronto, Canada. In 1973, he held the rank of 7th dan. In 1974, Park and several other ITF masters demonstrated taekwondo in Toronto—then being promoted as "the new home of the ITF" by Choi. Park and Choi went their separate ways after Choi insisted on establishing relations with North Korea during a politically sensitive period. By 2002, however, they were reconciled, and Park was present at Choi's deathbed.

In 2004, Park was President of the Canadian Taekwon-Do Association, and presented a seminar in Afghanistan. In 2008, Park conducted a seminar in Beijing. He headed taekwondo schools in Toronto.

Park is listed as a pioneer in Canada (1950s, 1960s, and 1970s) in Choi Chang-keun's list of taekwondo pioneers.

See also
 List of taekwondo grandmasters

References

External links
 Jong-soo Park Institute of Taekwon-Do
  (narrated by Park).

 

1941 births
2021 deaths
Martial arts school founders
Sportspeople from Toronto
South Korean male taekwondo practitioners
20th-century South Korean people